P'itiqucha (Quechua p'iti to divide by pulling powerfully to the extremes / gap, interruption, qucha lake, lagoon, "gap lake", hispanicized spelling Peticocha, Piticocha) is a lake in Peru located in the Lima Region, Huarochiri Province, Quinti District. P'itiqucha lies south of the Paryaqaqa mountain range and the lakes named Ch'uspiqucha and Paryachaka, west of  Mulluqucha and northwest of Pawqarqucha.

The sea ground of P'itiqucha is elevated in the middle which almost divides it into two parts. The naming of the lake refers to this interruption.

See also
 Nor Yauyos-Cochas Landscape Reserve
List of lakes in Peru

References

INEI, Compendio Estadistica 2007, page 26

Lakes of Peru
Lakes of Lima Region